Aleksa Ukropina (born 28 September 1998) is a Montenegrin water polo player. Aleksa started playing water polo at PVK Jadran, and he is a member of a first squad since 2013. Aleksa is playing for PVK Jadran in competitions like Montenegrin First League of Water Polo, Montenegrin Water Polo Cup, LEN Champions League , Adriatic water polo league.

Aleksa also plays for a senior Montenegro men's national water polo team. He played at 2015 World Aquatics Championships in Kazan and won a 5-th place, 2017 World Aquatics Championships in Budapest and won 5-th place.

Teams
PVK Jadran 2013 - 2018

Orvosegyetem SC 2018 - 2020

VK Radnički Kragujevac 2020 -

Trophies with clubs
Season 2013-2014 - Montenegrin First League of Water Polo - Champions, Montenegrin Water Polo Cup - Champions

Season 2014-2015 - Montenegrin First League of Water Polo - Champions, Montenegrin Water Polo Cup - Champions

Season 2015-2016 - Montenegrin First League of Water Polo - Champions, Montenegrin Water Polo Cup - Champions

Season 2016-2017 - Montenegrin First League of Water Polo - Champions, Montenegrin Water Polo Cup - Champions

Season 2017-2018 - Montenegrin First League of Water Polo - Champions, Montenegrin Water Polo Cup - Champions

References

External links
 

1998 births
Sportspeople from Belgrade
Living people
Montenegrin male water polo players
Water polo players at the 2020 Summer Olympics
Olympic water polo players of Montenegro